Maurizio Clerici (16 May 1929 – 21 February 2019) was an Italian rower. He competed in the men's coxless pair event at the 1956 Summer Olympics.

References

1929 births
2019 deaths
Italian male rowers
Olympic rowers of Italy
Rowers at the 1956 Summer Olympics
Sportspeople from Florence